Chenaux can refer to:

People
 Bernhard Chenaux (born 1939), Swiss footballer
 Eliot Chenaux (born 1947), American academic and competitive swimmer
 Robert Chenaux (born 1943), Puerto Rican Olympic swimmer

Places
 Chenaux, community in Township of Whitewater Region, Ontario, Canada
 Les Chenaux Regional County Municipality, Quebec, Canada
 Rivière des Chenaux, river in Quebec, Canada
 Chenaux Castle, Estavayer-le-Lac, Fribourg, Switzerland

See also
 Chenal (disambiguation)